Elachista afghana is a moth in the family Elachistidae, found in Afghanistan. It was described by Parenti in 1981.

References

Moths described in 1981
afghana
Moths of Asia